Burt is an unincorporated community in Hettinger County, in the U.S. state of North Dakota.

History
The name was originally Alton, but changed to Burt to avoid any confusion. A post office called Burt was established in 1910, and remained in operation until 1975. The community was named for A. M. Burt, a railroad official.

References

Unincorporated communities in Hettinger County, North Dakota
Unincorporated communities in North Dakota